Custoza is a northern Italian village and hamlet (frazione) of Sommacampagna, a municipality in the province of Verona, Veneto. As of 2011, its population was 812.

History

The village is famous for two battles fought during the Italian Independence Wars: the first in 1848 and the second in 1866, both against the Austrian Empire. In memory of them, the architect Giacomo Franco built the Ossuary of Custoza, a war grave and memorial building opened in 1879.

Geography
Custoza is a rural village located in the southwestern corner of its municipality, next to Villafranca di Verona (6 km south),  Valeggio sul Mincio (7 km west), and Tione dei Monti river. It is 5 km from Sommacampagna, 10 from Sona and Caselle, 12 from Verona-Villafranca Airport and 20 from Verona city centre.

The village consists of a central settlement and 3 detached, but close, quarters: Valbusa (west – ), Gorgo (east – ) and Bellavista (south – ). Its territory includes the surrounding little localities of Bagolina, Balconi Rossi, Coronini, Marognalonga, Monte Godio, Sgaripola and Vantini.

Main sights
 Ossuary of Custoza, built in 1879.
St. Peter in Vinculis Church, built in the 18th century.
 Villa Ottolini Pignatti Murano, built in the 17th century.
 House of the Sardinian Drummer-Boy, historical site related to the 1848 battle.

Gastronomy

The Bianco di Custoza ("Custoza White"), also known simply as "Custoza", is an Italian DOC wine produced in the countryside around the village.

Gallery

See also
First Italian War of Independence
Third Italian War of Independence

References

External links

 Web Site: Custoza Ossuary
 Custoza on tuttocitta.it 
 Custoza Wine Consortium website 

Frazioni of the Province of Verona